Anomiopus bonariensis is a species of true dung beetle that can be found in Argentina, Brazil (Minas Gerais) and Uruguay. It is a myrmecophile, and has been recorded living in nests of Acromyrmex lundii.

References

bonariensis
Beetles described in 1925